Ranked-choice voting  may be used as a synonym for:

 Ranked voting, a term used for any voting system in which voters are asked to rank candidates in order of preference
 Instant-runoff voting (IRV), a specific ranked voting system with single-winner districts
 Single transferable vote (STV), a specific ranked voting system with multi-winner districts